Antoine Pinto (born February 16, 1991), also known as Antoine Siangboxing, is a French kickboxer who trains in Thailand.

Pinto is best known as the youngest foreign fighter to have competed at the prestigious Lumpinee Stadium at 14 and Rajadamnern Stadium at 15.

He has competed for the Thai Fight and Glory promotions.

Biography and career
Antoine Siangboxing "The Phenom" was born as Antoine Pinto in France.   Antoine was born to a French father and French-Khmer mother.  His maternal grandfather was Lon Nonn, the younger brother of former Cambodian Prime Minister Lon Nol. He had his first fight at the age of 11. He was the youngest foreigner to have fought at Lumpinee Stadium at the age of 14 (2005) and is the youngest to have fought at Rajadamnern Stadium at the age of 15.

He defeated Farid Villaume by decision at Best of Siam 2 in Paris on November 22, 2012.

Thai Fight
He was set to fight Yodsanklai Fairtex at THAI FIGHT Extreme 2013: Bangkok in Bangkok, Thailand on June 29, 2013 but his opponent was changed to Tu Warren for unknown reasons. He beat Warren on points.

He TKO'd Dorian Price in round three at THAI FIGHT Extreme 2013: Pattani in Pattani, Thailand on September 22, 2013.

He outpointed Gustavo Mendes in a non-tournament affair at the opening round of the 2013 edition of Thai Fight's -70 kg/154 lb tournament in Thailand on October 23, 2013.

He beat Luca Novello by decision in a non-tournament match at the Thai Fight Semi-finals in Bangkok, Thailand on November 30, 2013.

He beat Eddie Vendetta by decision at THAI FIGHT World Battle 2014: Klai Kang Won in Hua Hin, Thailand on February 22, 2014.

On October 25, 2014, he defeated Michael Corley by TKO in the quarter-finals of the 2014 Thai Fight 72.5 kg King's Cup Tournament.

Pinto defeated Sen Buntheng by decision in the tournament semi-finals on November 22, 2014.

On December 21, 2014, Antoine Pinto faced Saiyok Pumpanmuang in the Thai Fight 72.5 kg Tournament Final, getting knocked down twice en route to a decision loss.

Glory
Antoine Pinto made his Glory debut on February 24, 2017, against Richard Abraham at Glory 38: Chicago. Pinto won by split decision.

Pinto was scheduled to face Casey Greene in the Glory Welterweight Contender Tournament Semi-final at Glory 44: Chicago. However, Greene withdrew from the fight and Pinto faced Zach Bunnell instead, winning by unanimous decision.

He went on to face Harut Grigorian in the Glory Welterweight Contender Tournament Final, losing by unanimous decision.

Titles and accomplishments

Titles
GLORY
2017 Glory 44 Welterweight 77 kg Contender Tournament Runner up 
Thai Fight
2016 Thai Fight 75 kg Superfight Champion 
2014 Thai Fight 72.5 kg Tournament Runner up. 
World Muaythai Council (WMC)
2011 WMC I-1 World Grand Prix Champion  (-66 kg)
2010 WMC Middle East Champion Dubai, UAE
2010 WMC I-1 Grand SLAM Super Fight Winner Hong Kong, China (-68 kg)
2010 WMC I-1 Super Fight Winner Hong Kong, China (-66 kg)
2007 WMC Vice Intercontinental Champion Astana, Kazakhstan (-65 kg)
World Professional Muaythai Federation (WPMF)
2011 WPMF World Super Welterweight Muaythai Champion (-70 kg / 154 lbs)
Toyota Marathon
2011 Toyota Cup Marathon - Thailand 72 kg (semi-finalist)
The Challenger Muaythai 
2011 The Challenger Muaythai - Malaysia (semi-finalist)
The Contender Asia
2009 Contender Asia France Runner Up (-71 kg) Paris
World Association of Kickboxing Organizations (WAKO)
2009 WAKO Pro European Thaiboxing  Champion (-71 kg)
Golden Belt (United Kingdom)
2008 Golden Belt World Champion - Liverpool  United Kingdom
2008 Golden Belt Superfight Champion Liverpool (147 lbs)
King's Cup Malaysia 
2008 King's Cup Malaysia Champion Kheda (Malaysia)
Lyon Fights
2007 Lyons Fights Winner (-145 lbs) Thailand
X-One Championship 
2006 X-One Belt Champion Thailand (-127 lbs)
Thailand Regional 
2005 South Thailand Provinces Belt Thailand (-125 lbs)
Awards:
2007 Best Wai Khru in Lumpinee Stadium, Channel 5 
Ranked Top 05 in Supreme Striking 155 Lbs 
Ranked Top 10 in WBC 154 Lbs
Ranked Top 10 in Lumpinee stadium 154 lbs
Ranked Top 10 in Siam Omnoi stadium  154 lbs
Ranked Top 10 in GLORY kickboxing 77 kg

Muay Thai record

|-  style="background:#fbb;"
| 2017-08-25 || Loss ||align=left| Harut Grigorian || Glory 44: Chicago Welterweight Contender Tournament, Final - 77 kg || Chicago, United States || Decision || 3 || 3:00
|-  style="background:#cfc;"
| 2017-08-25 || Win ||align=left| Zach Bunnell || Glory 44: Chicago Welterweight Contender Tournament, Semi-final - 77 kg || Chicago, United States ||Unanimous Decision || 3 || 3:00
|-  style="background:#cfc;"
| 2017-04-08 || Win ||align=left| Aydin Tunkay || THAI FIGHT Paris - 77 kg || Paris, France ||Unanimous Decision || 3 || 3:00
|-  style="background:#cfc;"
| 2017-02-24 || Win ||align=left| Richard Abraham || Glory 38: Chicago - 77 kg || Chicago, United States ||Decision || 3 || 3:00
|-  style="background:#cfc;"
| 2016-12-24 || Win ||align=left| Sudsakorn Sor Klinmee || THAI FIGHT The Fighter King - 75 kg/ || Bangkok, Thailand ||Decision (Unanimous) || 4 || 3:00
|-  style="background:#cfc;"
| 2016-11-19 || Win ||align=left| Ilyass Chakir || THAI FIGHT AIR RACE 1 – 75 kg/ || Rayong, Thailand ||Decision (Unanimous) || 3 || 3:00
|-  style="background:#cfc;"
| 2016-09-11 || Win ||align=left| Artur Saladiak || THAI FIGHT London -75 kg/ || London, England ||Decision (Unanimous) || 3 || 3:00
|-
|-  bgcolor="#CCFFCC"
| 2016-08-20 || Win ||align=left| Ayhan Isik || THAI FIGHT KMITL - 75 kg/ || Bangkok, Thailand || TKO || 2 || 3:00
|-
|-  bgcolor="#CCFFCC"
| 2016-07-23 || Win ||align=left| Anouar Khamlali || THAI FIGHT Proud to Be Thai 2016 -75 kg/ || Bangkok, Thailand || Decision (Unanimous) || 3 || 3:00
|-  style="background:#fbb;"
| 2015-12-31 || Loss ||align=left| Eakchanachai Kaewsamrit || THAI FIGHT Count Down || Bangkok, Thailand || Decision || 3 || 3:00
|-  bgcolor="#CCFFCC"
| 2015-11-21 || Win ||align=left| Malik Watson || THAI FIGHT RPCA - 72.5 kg || Nakhon Pathom, Thailand ||Winner by KO round 02 (Elbow) || 2 || 3:00
|-  bgcolor="#CCFFCC"
| 2015-10-25 || Win ||align=left| Pascal Schroth ||THAI FIGHT Proud to Be Thai: Vietnam - 72.5 kg || Ho Chi Minh City, Vietnam ||Decision (Unanimous) || 3 || 3:00
|-  bgcolor="#CCFFCC"
| 2015-08-22 || Win ||align=left| Charlie Guest || THAI FIGHT Proud to Be Thai: Narathiwat - 72.5 kg || Narathiwat, Thailand ||Decision (Unanimous) || 3 || 3:00
|-  bgcolor="#CCFFCC"
| 2015-05-02 || Win ||align=left| Matheus Pereira || THAI FIGHT Samui 2015 – 72 kg || Ko Samui, Thailand || DQ || 1 || 3:00
|-  bgcolor="#CCFFCC"
| 2015-04-04 || Win ||align=left| Bruce Macfie || THAI FIGHT CRMA - 72 kg || Nakhon Nayok, Thailand || TKO (Knee) || 2 || 3:00
|-  style="background:#fbb;"
| 2014-12-21 || Loss ||align=left| Saiyok Pumpanmuang || Thai Fight 2014 - 72.5 kg Tournament Final || Bangkok, Thailand || Decision  || 3 || 3:00
|-  bgcolor="#CCFFCC"
| 2014-11-22 || Win ||align=left| Sen Buntheng || Thai Fight 2014 - 72.5 kg Tournament Semi-final || Khon Kaen, Thailand || Decision (Unanimous) || 3 || 3:00
|-  bgcolor="#CCFFCC"
| 2014-10-25 || Win ||align=left| Michael Corley || Thai Fight 2014 - 72.5 kg Tournament Quarter-final || Bangkok, Thailand || TKO (Elbow) || 3 ||3:00
|-  bgcolor="#CCFFCC"
| 2014-09-20 || Win ||align=left| Eduart Pachi || THAI FIGHT World Battle 2014: Vietnam- 72 kg/160 lb || Ho Chi Minh City, Vietnam || Decision (Unanimous)  || 3 || 3:00
|-  bgcolor="#CCFFCC"
| 2014-08-16 || Win ||align=left| Sen Buntheng || THAI FIGHT World Battle 2014: Nakhon Sawan - 72 kg/160 lb || Nakhon Sawan, Thailand || Decision (Unanimous) || 3 || 3:00
|-  bgcolor="#CCFFCC"
| 2014-06-28 || Win ||align=left| Zidong Zhu || THAI FIGHT World Battle 2014: Macao - 72 kg/160 lb || Macau, China || KO  || 1 || 3:00
|-
|-  bgcolor="#CCFFCC"
| 2014-04-06 || Win ||align=left| Alan Ryan || THAI FIGHT World Battle 2014: Chakrinaruebet -72 kg/160 lb || Sattahip, Thailand || TKO  || 2 || 3:00
|-  bgcolor="#CCFFCC"
| 2014-02-22 || Win ||align=left| Eddie Vendetta || THAI FIGHT World Battle 2014: Klai Kang Won -72 kg/160 lb || Hua Hin, Thailand || Decision (Unanimous) || 3 || 3:00
|-
|-  bgcolor="#CCFFCC"
| 2013-12-22 || Win ||align=left| Sharos Huyer ||  Thai Fight 2013 – 72 kg/160 lb Tournament || Bangkok, Thailand || Decision (Unanimous) || 3 || 3:00
|-
|-  bgcolor="#CCFFCC"
| 2013-11-30 || Win ||align=left| Lucas Novello ||  Thai Fight 2013 – 70 kg/154 lb Tournament || Bangkok, Thailand || Decision (Unanimous) || 3 || 3:00
|-
|-  bgcolor="#CCFFCC"
| 2013-10-23 || Win ||align=left| Gustavo Mendes ||  Thai Fight 2013 – 70 kg/154 lb Tournament || Bangkok, Thailand || Decision (Unanimous) || 3 || 3:00
|-
|-  bgcolor="#CCFFCC"
| 2013-09-22 || Win ||align=left| Dorian Price || THAI FIGHT Extreme 2013: Pattani || Pattani, Thailand || TKO (left low kick) || 3 ||3:00 
|-
|-  bgcolor="#CCFFCC"
| 2013-06-29 || Win ||align=left| Tu Warren || THAI FIGHT Extreme 2013: Bangkok || Bangkok, Thailand || Decision (Unanimous) || 3 || 3:00
|-
|-  bgcolor="#CCFFCC"
| 2012-11-22 || Win ||align=left| Farid Villaume || Best of Siam 2 || Paris, France || Decision (Unanimous) || 5 || 3:00
|-  style="background:#fbb;"
| 2012-06-23 || Loss ||align=left| Eakchanachai Kaewsamrit || Weber Tournament 67 kg, Siam Omnoi Stadium || Bangkok, Thailand || Decision || 5 || 3:00
|-  style="background:#fbb;"
| 2012-05-12 || Loss ||align=left| Dernchonlek Sor. Sor. Niyom || Weber Tournament 67 kg, Siam Omnoi Stadium || Bangkok, Thailand || TKO || 4 ||3:00 
|-  bgcolor="#CCFFCC"
| 2012-03-17 || Win ||align=left| Thepsutin Phumpanmuang ||CH 11 Fights-Imperial Ladphrao Stadium|| Bangkok, Thailand || KO (Knee) || 4 || 3:00
|-
|-  style="background:#fbb;"
| 2011-10-28|| Loss ||align=left| Yodsanklai Fairtex || Toyota Cup Marathon 72 kg, Semi Finals || Korat, Thailand || Split Decision || 3 || 2:00
|-  bgcolor="#CCFFCC"
| 2011-10-28 || Win  ||align=left| Ali Muchavi || Toyota Cup Marathon 72 kg, Quarter Finals || Korat, Thailand || Decision (Unanimous)|| 3 || 2:00
|-  style="background:#fbb;"
| 2011-11-07 || Loss ||align=left| Tum Mardsua || The Challenger Muaythai, Semi Finals || Kuala Lumpur, Malaysia || KO || 2 || 
|-  bgcolor="#CCFFCC"
| 2011-11-03 || Win||align=left| Faizal Ramli || The Challenger Muaythai, Quarter Finals || Kuala Lumpur, Malaysia || TKO || 5 || 3:00
|-  bgcolor="#CCFFCC"
| 2011-09-17 || Win  ||align=left| Ilya Grad || The Challenger Muaythai, Opening Round || Kuala Lumpur, Malaysia || Decision (Unanimous)|| 5 || 3:00
|-
|-  bgcolor="#CCFFCC"
| 2011-07-23 || Win ||align=left| Saenchainoi Pumphanmuang || Thailand Versus Challenger Series 2011 || Bangkok, Thailand || Decision (Unanimous) || 5 || 3:00
|-
|-  bgcolor="#CCFFCC"
| 2011-04-21 || Win ||align=left| Kurt Finlayson || W.M.C. I-1 World GP '11, Final || Hong Kong, China || Decision (Split) || 3 || 3:00 
|-
! style=background:white colspan=9 |
|- 
|-  bgcolor="#CCFFCC"
| 2011-04-21 || Win ||align=left| Vladimir Konsky || W.M.C. I-1 World GP '11, Semi Finals || Hong Kong, China || Decision (Split) || 3 || 3:00 
|-
|-  bgcolor="#CCFFCC"
| 2011-04-21 || Win ||align=left| Rhassan Muhareb || W.M.C. I-1 World GP '11, Quarter Finals || Hong Kong, China || Decision (Unanimous) || 3 || 3:00 
|-
|-  style="background:#fbb;"
| 2011-03-05 || Loss ||align=left| Nopparat Keatkhamtorn || Siam Omnoi Stadium - Channel 3 || Bangkok, Thailand || Decision || 5 || 3:00
|-
|-  style="background:#cfc;"
| 2011-01-21 || Win ||align=left| Bovy Sor Udomson || Channel 3 || Supanburi, Thailand || Decision (Unanimous) || 5 || 3:00
|-
! style=background:white colspan=9 |
|-  style="background:#fbb;"
| 2010-12-05|| Loss ||align=left| Jordan Watson || King's Birthday 2010, Quarter Final || Bangkok, Thailand || Decision (Split) || 3 || 2:00
|-  style="background:#cfc;"
| 2010-11-25 || Win ||align=left| Zidov Dominik || War on the Shore 3 || Dubai, UAE || Decision (Unanimous) || 5 || 3:00
|-
! style=background:white colspan=9 |
|-  style="background:#cfc;"
| 2010-11-22 || Win ||align=left| Lerm Ratchakhom || WMC I-1 World Muaythai Grand SLAM 2010 || Hong Kong, China || Decision (Unanimous) || 5 || 3:00
|-
|-  style="background:#fbb;"
| 2010-10-29 || Loss ||align=left| Eakpracha Meenayothin || Toyota Marathon 154 lb, Semi Final || Udon Thani, Thailand || Decision || 5 || 3:00
|-  style="background:#cfc;"
| 2010-10-29 || Win ||align=left| Denis Oliwka || Toyota Marathon 154 lb, Quarter Final || Udon Thani, Thailand || TKO || 2 ||3:00
|-  style="background:#fbb;"
| 2010-08-20 || Loss ||align=left| Hokfut || S1 Belt Championships, Semi Final || Pattaya, Thailand || TKO (Low Kick) || 3 ||3:00
|-  style="background:#cfc;"
| 2010-08-20 || Win ||align=left| Igor Pedote || S1 Belt Championships, Quarter Final || Pattaya, Thailand || TKO || 2 ||3:00
|-  style="background:#fbb;"
| 2010-08-12 || Loss ||align=left| Saiyok Pumpanmuang || Thailand vs Challenger Onesongchai Series || Bangkok, Thailand || Decision (Unanimous) || 5 || 3:00
|-  style="background:#cfc;"
| 2010-05-20 || Win ||align=left| Noppakaw Sor Wanchart || I-1 World Muaythai Super Fights || Hong Kong, China || Decision (Unanimous) || 5 || 3:00
|-
! style=background:white colspan=9 |
|-  style="background:#fbb;"
| 2010-05-12 || Loss ||align=left| Moset Sor Sienkiengnoi || S1 World Championship || Thailand || Decision || 5 || 3:00
|-
! style=background:white colspan=9 |
|-  style="background:#fbb;"
| 2010-03-23 || Loss ||align=left| Santichai Or Boonchauy || I-1 World Title Super 8, Semi Final || Hong Kong, China || Decision (Unanimous) || 3 || 3:00
|-  style="background:#cfc;"
| 2010-03-23 || Win ||align=left| Peyman Shahrokni || I-1 World Title Super 8, Quarter Final || Hong Kong, China || Decision (Split) || 3 || 3:00
|-  style="background:#fbb;"
| 2010-01-16 || Loss ||align=left| Nopparat Keatkhamtorn || Thailand vs Challenger Series || Bangkok, Thailand || Decision (Split) || 5 || 3:00
|-  style="background:#cfc;"
| 2009-00-00 || Win ||align=left| Adun Noi Sit Benjama || Onesongchai Promotion || Bangkok, Thailand || KO || 4 ||3:00
|-  style="background:#fbb;"
| 2009-11-27 || Loss ||align=left| Sapapet Sor Sakaopet || Toyota Vigo Cup || Bangkok, Thailand || Decision (Split) || 3 || 3:00
|-  style="background:#fbb;"
| 2009-11-07 || Loss ||align=left| Tum Madsua || I-1 Grand Extreme 2009 - Asian Title, Semi Final || Macau, China || Decision (Unanimous)|| 3 || 3:00
|-  style="background:#cfc;"
| 2009-09-15 || Win ||align=left| Sapapet Sor Sakaopet || Lumpinee Stadium  || Bangkok, Thailand || TKO || 3 ||3:00
|-  style="background:#cfc;"
| 2009-08-07 || Win ||align=left| Bobey Sor Vorapin || Lumpinee Stadium  || Bangkok, Thailand || TKO || 3 ||3:00
|-  style="background:#fbb;"
| 2009-06-26 || Loss ||align=left| Sofian Seboussi || Gala International Multi-Boxes || Paris, France || Decision || 5 || 3:00
|-  style="background:#cfc;"
| 2009-05-02 || Win ||align=left| Mourad Bourachid || WAKO Pro European Championship  || Epinal, France || TKO (Elbow/Cut) || 4 ||3:00
|-
! style=background:white colspan=9 |
|-  style="background:#fbb;"
| 2009-04-11 || Loss ||align=left| Mourad Bourachid || La Nuit des Boxeurs Thai || Brest, France || Decision (Split) || 5 || 3:00
|-  style="background:#fbb;"
| 2009-03-20 || Loss ||align=left| Cédric Muller || Contenders Asia French Selection, Final || Paris, France || Decision (Unanimous) || 3 || 3:00
|-
! style=background:white colspan=9 |
|-  style="background:#cfc;"
| 2009-03-20 || Win ||align=left| Nicolas Germain || Contender Asia French Selection, Semi Final || Paris, France || Decision (Unanimous) || 3 || 3:00
|-  style="background:#cfc;"
| 2009-03-20 || Win ||align=left| Salahdine Ait Naceur || Contender Asia French Selection, Quarter Final || Paris, France || Decision (Unanimous) || 3 || 3:00
|-  style="background:#fbb;"
| 2009-00-00 || Loss ||align=left| Wutthichai Sor Tuptimsakesan || Z1 World muaythai series Malaysia || Malaysia || Split Decision || 3 || 3:00
|-  style="background:#cfc;"
| 2009-01-16 || Win ||align=left| Mica Virapol || Lumpinee Stadium || Bangkok, Thailand || TKO || 2 ||3:00
|-  style="bgcolor="#CCFFCC;"
| 2008-11-08 || Draw ||align=left| Liam Robinson || Golden Belt in UK || Liverpool, England || Draw || 5 || 3:00
|- style=background:white colspan=9 || Liam Robinson Wins Golden Belt Superfight (147 lbs)
|- style="background:#fbb;"
| 2008-08-22 || Loss ||align=left| Bill Chong || Libogen Fight Night VII || Hong Kong, China || Split Decision || 3 || 3:00
|-  style="background:#cfc;"
| 2008-05-10 || Win ||align=left| Robin van Roosmalen || Golden Belt Super Fight || Liverpool, England || Unanimous Decision || 5 ||3:00

|-  style="background:#fbb;"
| 2008-03-14 || Loss ||align=left| Tantawan Sor Borwornrat || Lumpinee Stadium || Bangkok, Thailand || Decision || 5 || 3:00
|-  style="background:#cfc;"
| 2008-04-26 || Win ||align=left| Kangpeth || Lumpinee Stadium || Bangkok, Thailand || KO || 1 ||3:00
|-  style="background:#cfc;"
| 2008-00-00 || Win ||align=left| Thongpeth Sor Sitpeth || Lumpinee Stadium || Bangkok, Thailand || KO || 3 ||3:00
|-  style="background:#cfc;"
| 2008-00-00 || Win ||align=left| Saksit Chopaksit || Kings Cup - Kheda || Malaysia || TKO (Cut)|| 2 ||3:00
|-  style="background:#fbb;"
| 2007-11-03 || Loss ||align=left| Aphisak KT.Gym || Muaythai Lumpinee Krikkrai Fights || Bangkok, Thailand || TKO || 4 || 
|-  style="background:#cfc;"
| 2007-09-29 || Win ||align=left| Abbe Mishihito || Petchyindee Promotion, Lumpinee Stadium || Bangkok, Thailand || TKO (Elbow) || 1 ||3:00
|-  style="background:#cfc;"
| 2007-09-02 || Win ||align=left| Neug Samchai || Phattalung Stadium || Thailand || TKO (Elbow) || 3 ||3:00
|-  style="background:#cfc;"
| 2007-00-00 || Win ||align=left| Yod Narrong || Lumpinee Stadium || Bangkok, Thailand || KO || 1 ||3:00
|-  style="background:#cfc;"
| 2007-06-30 || Win ||align=left| Jarenthon Por Sitphet || Lumpinee Stadium || Bangkok, Thailand || TKO (Elbow) || 5 ||3:00
|-  style="background:#cfc;"
| 2007-05-05 || Win ||align=left| Thonpeth Sor Sitpeth || Lumpinee Stadium || Bangkok, Thailand || KO || 3 ||3:00
|-  style="background:#fbb;"
| 2007-03-22 || Loss ||align=left| Amirbayev Dauren || WMC Championship || Astana, Kazakhstan || Decision || 5 || 3:00
|-
! style=background:white colspan=9 |
|-  style="background:#cfc;"
| 2007-00-00 || Win ||align=left| Superboy Noi || Waisak Fights || Thailand || TKO (Referee Stoppage) || 1 ||3:00
|-  style="background:#cfc;"
| 2007-00-00 || Win ||align=left| Chokchaikun || Hua Hin Arena Boxing Stadium  || Thailand || TKO (Referee Stoppage) || 2 ||3:00
|-  style="background:#cfc;"
| 2007-00-00 || Win ||align=left| Nompakrao || Bangsaphan || Thailand || TKO (Referee Stoppage) || 2 ||3:00
|-  style="background:#cfc;"
| 2007-00-00 || Win ||align=left| Praek Phathalung || Pimai Muaythai fights || Amphoe Khuan Khanun || TKO || 3 ||3:00
|-  style="background:#cfc;"
| 2007-00-00 || Win ||align=left| Chai Narrong || Hua Hin Arena Boxing Stadium || Khuan Khanun || TKO || 2 ||3:00
|-  style="background:#cfc;"
| 2006-08-27 || Win ||align=left| Malick Bah || Rajadamnern Stadium || Bangkok, Thailand || TKO (Dislocated shoulder) || 3 ||3:00
|-  style="background:#fbb;"
| 2006-06-24 || Loss ||align=left| Boondong Tor Phonchai || P.Pramuk Fights, Lumpinee Stadium || Bangkok, Thailand || Decision || 5 || 3:00
|-  style="background:#cfc;"
| 2006-06-21 || Win ||align=left| Michael Yang || Rajadamnern Stadium || Bangkok, Thailand || TKO (Cut) || 4 || 3:00
|-  style="background:#fbb;"
| 2006-02-25 || Loss ||align=left| Rukkard S.Mardnarong || P.Pramuk Fights, Lumpinee Stadium || Bangkok, Thailand || Decision || 5 || 3:00
|-  style="background:#cfc;"
| 2006-02-13 || Win ||align=left| Nazee Tiger Gym || International Lyons Fights || Thailand || KO || 2 ||3:00
|-
|-  style="background:#cfc;"
| 2006-01-14 || Win ||align=left| Yodnarong V.P.Udon || P.Pramuk Fights, Lumpinee Stadium || Bangkok, Thailand || TKO || 1 || 
|-  style="background:#cfc;"
| 2006-01-01 || Win ||align=left| Khadam Death Paifa || Pimai Muaythai fights || Prachuap Khiri Khan || KO || 4 ||3:00
|-  style="background:#cfc;"
| 2005-12-22 || Win ||align=left| Boondung Tor Phonchai || X-One Championship || Thailand || KO || 2 ||3:00
|-
! style=background:white colspan=9 |
|-  style="background:#cfc;"
| 2005-11-22 || Win ||align=left| Fouloung Pathongpong || Por Pramuk Fights, Lumpinee Stadium || Bangkok, Thailand || KO || 2 ||3:00
|-  style="background:#fbb;"
| 2005-10-08 || Loss ||align=left| Phetnarong S.Mongkonked || P.Pramuk Fights, Lumpinee Stadium || Bangkok, Thailand || TKO || 1 ||
|-
|-  style="background:#cfc;"
| 2005-09-09 || Win ||align=left| Kingtong Pathongpong || Por Pramuk Fights, Lumpinee Stadium || Bangkok, Thailand || KO || 2 ||3:00
|-  style="background:#cfc;"
| 2005-06-19 || Win ||align=left| Songkhamchai || Big Buddhas Temple in Bangkhrut || Thailand || KO || 1 ||3:00
|-
! style=background:white colspan=9 |
|-  style="background:#cfc;"
| 2004-00-00 || Win ||align=left| Nongmai || Muaythai in southern Thailand || Thailand || KO (Knee) || 4 ||3:00
|-  style="background:#cfc;"
| 2004-10-14 || Win ||align=left| Chokchaicun || Hua Hin Arena Stadium || Thailand || KO || 3 ||3:00
|-  style="background:#cfc;"
| 2004-08-21 || Win ||align=left| Nopakhao || Bangsaphan Stadium || Thailand || KO || 1 ||3:00
|-
| colspan=9 | Legend:

See also 
List of male kickboxers

References

Living people
1991 births
French people of Cambodian descent
French male kickboxers
Welterweight kickboxers
French Muay Thai practitioners
People from Toulouse
People from Haute-Garonne
Antoine Pinto
French actors
French male actors
French models
French television presenters
French YouTubers
Antoine Pinto
French expatriate sportspeople in Thailand